The Player of the Month is an association football award that recognises the best La Liga player each month of the season.

Winners

Multiple winners
The below table lists players who have won the award on more than one occasion.

As of October 2022 award.

Awards won by position
As of February 2023 award.

Awards won by nationality
As of February 2023 award.

Awards won by club
As of February 2023 award.

Footnotes

References

La Liga trophies and awards
Spanish football trophies and awards
Association football player of the month awards